Maharajadhiraj Uday Chand Women's College, known as M. U. C. Women's College, established on 28 July 1955, is a women's college in Bardhaman. It offers undergraduate courses in arts and science and PG course in English. It was at first affiliated to Calcutta University. In 1960 when the University of Burdwan was established, the college became one of the affiliated colleges of the newly established university. Subsequently, when PG course in English was introduced in the college in 2005, it became a constituent college of the University  University of Burdwan.

Departments 
At present, the following courses are taught in the college

Science

Chemistry Hons
Physics Hons
Mathematics Hons
Botany Hons
Zoology Hons
Computer Science
Microbiology Hons
Nutrition Hons
B.Sc. General (Pure & Bio)

Arts

Bengali Hons
English Hons
Sanskrit Hons
History Hons
Geography Hons
Political Science Hons
Philosophy Hons
Economics Hons
B.A. General
In 2015 the college got affiliation for BCA course and the college has taken decision to move the University for introduction of PG course in a Science subject from 2016–17 academic session.
The student strength of the college, the three years taken together, is over 4000.

Accreditation
Located in 23°14’23"N and 87°51’10"E, the college is recognized by the University Grants Commission (UGC). It was re-accredited by the National Assessment and Accreditation Council (NAAC), and awarded B grade in 2012, an accreditation that is still valid. The college is the coveted destination of aspirants of higher education. Every year the name of many students of the college figures in list of University rank holders . The college celebrated the Diamond Jubilee of its establishment in 2015. The college is one of the colleges of WB found eligible for funding under Rashtriya Uchchatar Shiksha Abhiyan (RUSA). The number of faculty at present: Full Time 55 (including two Librarians), PTT 14, CWTT 4. There are about 30 NTS, 7 Hostel Staff and over a dozen working in the college and three Hostels on temporary basis. The Hostels have been named after Rokeya, Swarnakumari and Sarala - three Bengali pathfinders of women education. The central vision of the college is 'Women Education: from Enlightenment to Empowerment' which may be translated into Sanskrit as नारीशिक्षा  - बोधोदयात् शक्त्युद्गमः.

See also
List of institutions of higher education in West Bengal
Education in India
Education in West Bengal

References

External links
M. U. C. Women's College

Colleges affiliated to University of Burdwan
Educational institutions established in 1955
Universities and colleges in Purba Bardhaman district
Women's universities and colleges in West Bengal
1955 establishments in West Bengal